The Great Atlantic and Pacific Tea Company (A&P) Warehouse, located at 67 Vestry Street, is a historic building in the Tribeca section of Lower Manhattan in New York City. Originally a storage building, it was later converted to residential use and has since been historically linked to the New York City arts scene.

History
The A&P Warehouse, built for the Great Atlantic & Pacific Tea Company grocery chain, was completed in 1897 and features a fortress-like Romanesque Revival facade. Designed by architect Frederick P. Dinkelberg as a seven-story storage building, two additional stories and an extension were eventually added. This renovation, completed in 1910, was designed by architect Frank Helme.

Many historic buildings around the A&P Warehouse, including the original A&P storefront at 31 Vesey Street, were destroyed by government-led mid-20th Century urban renewal projects. After A&P moved across the Hudson River to Jersey City, New Jersey, the warehouse was converted to loft apartments. By the 1970s artists had set up homes and studios within the lofts. Several famous 20th-Century artists, most notably  Marisol, Andy Warhol, John Chamberlain, Wim Wenders and Robert Wilson, have called the former A&P Warehouse home.

Uncertain future
In 2014, developer Aby Rosen, 67 Vestry Street's current owner, has announced that he would like to replace the structure with a new eleven story residential tower. Current residents and local preservationists have formed a movement to bring landmark status to the structure in order to stop its demolition.

See also
Great Atlantic and Pacific Tea Company Warehouse (successor A&P Warehouse)
A & P Food Stores Building (another A&P company structure)
List of New York City Designated Landmarks in Manhattan below 14th Street

References

Andy Warhol
Art in New York City
Artist colonies
Arts centers in New York City
Commercial buildings completed in 1897
Commercial buildings in New York City
Culture of New York City
The Great Atlantic & Pacific Tea Company
Residential buildings in Manhattan
Romanesque Revival architecture in New York City
Tribeca
Warehouses on the National Register of Historic Places